Joel Rodríguez (born 19 May 1974) is a Mexican diver. He competed at the 1996 Summer Olympics and the 2000 Summer Olympics.

References

1974 births
Living people
Mexican male divers
Olympic divers of Mexico
Divers at the 1996 Summer Olympics
Divers at the 2000 Summer Olympics
Place of birth missing (living people)